Ivek (also Romanized as Īvek; also known as Dīvek) is a village in Sharq va Gharb-e Shirgah Rural District, North Savadkuh County, Mazandaran Province, Iran. At the 2006 census, its population was 893, in 214 families.

References 

Populated places in Savadkuh County